İsmail Hakkı Sunat (17 October 1966 – 14 July 2004) was a Turkish theater, cinema and television actor.

İsmail Hakkı Sunat, artist of Ankara State Theater's General Directorate, took part in many theater plays. The artist, who moved from Ankara to the Istanbul State Theater, also starred in commercials, TV series and a movie. Sunat, who was married to Deniz Uğur and has a child, also worked in the search and rescue team working in the earthquake of 17 August 1999. The artist, who was killed by shooting with a gun, was shown as "one of the theater hopes of the future". He was buried in Gallipoli.

Theatre 

 King Lear
 Between the Riot
 Bandits
 Comedy in the Dark
 In the Moonlight

Television 
 Zümrüt - 2004
 Benimle Evlenir misin? - 2001
 Mert Ali - 2000
 Ateş Dansı - 1998
 Kördüğüm - 1997
 Gamsızlar - 1993

Awards 

 2003 Afife Jale Awards, Between Legends game, "Most Successful Supporting Actor of the Year" award.

References

External links 

 

1966 births
2004 deaths
Turkish male stage actors
Turkish male television actors
Turkish murder victims
People murdered in Turkey
Deaths by firearm in Turkey